Manigachhi Assembly constituency was an assembly constituency in Darbhanga district in the Indian state of Bihar.

As a consequence of the orders of the Delimitation Commission of India, Manigachhi Assembly constituency ceased to exist in 2010.

It was part of Darbhanga Lok Sabha constituency.

Results

1977–2005
In the October 2005 state assembly elections, Lalit Kmar Yadav of RJD won the Manigachhi assembly seat defeating his nearest rival Prabhakar Chaudhary of JD(U). Contests in most years were multi cornered but only winners and runners are being mentioned. Prabhakar Chaudhary of JD(U) defeated Lalit Kumar Yadav of RJD in February 2009. Lalit Kumar Yadav of RJD/ JD defeated Dr. Madan Mohan Jha of Congress in 2000 and 1995. Madan Mohan Jha of Congress defeated Ashok Kumar of JD in 1990 and Ramakant Choudhary of JP in 1985. Nagendra Jha of Congress defeated Indrakant Jha of Janata Party (Secular – Charan Singh)/ JP in 1980 and 1977.

References

Former assembly constituencies of Bihar
Politics of Darbhanga district